The Banks County School District is a public school district in Banks County, Georgia, United States, based in Homer. It serves the communities of Alto, Baldwin, Gillsville, Homer, Lula, and Maysville. There are four schools in the district, which educate 2,788 students in kindergarten through 12th grade.

Schools
The Banks County School District has two elementary schools, one middle school, and one high school.

Elementary schools
 Banks County Elementary School (grades 3 - 5)
 Banks County Primary School (kindergarten - 2nd grade)

Middle school
 Banks County Middle School (grades 6 - 8)

High school
 Banks County High School (grades 9 - 12)

References

External links
 

School districts in Georgia (U.S. state)
Education in Banks County, Georgia